Skwierawy  is a village in Gmina Studzienice, Bytów County, Pomeranian Voivodeship, in northern Poland.

From 1975 to 1998 the village was in Słupsk Voivodeship. 

It has a population of 175.

Transport
Skwierawy lies on national road number 20.

References

Map of Gmina Studzienice

Skwierawy